Potter's Covered Bridge, also known as Potter's Bridge and Potter's Ford Bridge, is a historic covered bridge located in Potter's Bridge Park in Noblesville in Noblesville Township, Hamilton County, Indiana.  It was built in 1871, and is a Howe truss structure measuring 260 feet long, 22 feet wide, and 20 feet tall.  The single span bridge rests on limestone abutments and has walls clad in vertical board siding.

It was listed on the National Register of Historic Places in 1991.  Potter's Bridge Park has been home to the Potter's Bridge Fall Festival, occurring every October, for over 20 years.

References

Covered bridges on the National Register of Historic Places in Indiana
Bridges completed in 1871
Transportation buildings and structures in Hamilton County, Indiana
National Register of Historic Places in Hamilton County, Indiana
Road bridges on the National Register of Historic Places in Indiana
Wooden bridges in Indiana
Howe truss bridges in the United States
1871 establishments in Indiana